Pitheciinae is a subfamily of the New World monkey family Pitheciidae. It contains three genera and 14 species. Pitheciines are forest dwellers from northern and central South America, east of the Andes.

They are small to medium-sized primates, with a stocky build due to their close skin. The skin is covered in shaggy fur, its coloring varies depending upon species from black to grey and brown up to white. Parts of the face can be bald. The tail, which is not used for grasping but for balance, is also hairy, although the uakari's tail is only a stub.

Like most New World monkeys, they are diurnal and arboreal. They are good climbers and spend the majority of their life in the trees. They live in groups ranging in number from small groups (such as with the saki monkeys ) to as many as 50 animals. They communicate with a set of sounds which typically includes high cries and a nearly bird-like twitter.

Pitheciines are generally omnivores, the main part of their diet coming from fruits and insects. This is supplemented by flowers, buds, nuts and small vertebrates. Large canines help them to break through the hard rind of the unripe fruits.

Births are typically of single offspring with a gestation time of about 5 to 6 months. They typically reach maturity at approximately 3 to 4 years and can become up to 15 years old.

Classification 
 Family Pitheciidae: titis, sakis and uakaris
 Subfamily Pitheciinae
 Genus Pithecia
 Equatorial saki, Pithecia aequatorialis 
 White-footed saki or buffy saki , Pithecia albicans 
Cazuza's saki, Pithecia cazuzai 
Golden-faced saki, Pithecia chrysocephala 
 Hairy saki, Pithecia hirsuta 
 Burnished saki, Pithecia inusta 
 Rio Tapajós saki or Gray's bald-faced saki, Pithecia irrorata 
 Isabel's saki, Pithecia isabela 
 Monk saki, Pithecia monachus 
 Miller's saki, Pithecia milleri 
 Mittermeier's Tapajós saki, Pithecia mittermeieri (disputed)
 Napo saki, Pithecia napensis 
Pissinatti’s saki, Pithecia pissinattii (disputed)
 White-faced saki, Pithecia pithecia
 Rylands' bald-faced saki, Pithecia rylandsi (disputed)
 Vanzolini's bald-faced saki, Pithecia vanzolinii 
 Genus Chiropotes
 Black bearded saki, Chiropotes satanas
 Red-backed bearded saki, Chiropotes chiropotes
 Brown-backed bearded saki, Chiropotes israelita
 Uta Hick's bearded saki, Chiropotes utahickae
 White-nosed saki, Chiropotes albinasus
 Genus Cacajao
 Black-headed uakari, Cacajao melanocephalus
 Bald uakari, Cacajao calvus
 Aracá uakari, Cacajao ayresii
 Neblina uakari, Cacajao hosomi
 Subfamily Callicebinae

References

 
Extant Miocene first appearances